Aleksandra Kisio (born 22 March 1983) is a Polish actress.

Filmography 
1999: Chłopaki nie płaczą – guest's in bar partner
2002: Edi
2002: Kariera Nikosia Dyzmy
2002: Jak to się robi z dziewczynami
2005: Szaleńcy
2005: The Call of the Toad
2006: Dublerzy
2006: Rzeźnia numer 1
2006-2007: Kopciuszek
2007: Testosteron
2009: Brzydula
2014: Galeria
2011: Prosto w serce
2013: Pierwsza miłość

References

External links 
Aleksandra Kisio at filmpolski.pl

Polish actresses
1983 births
Living people